Marc Gicquel and Michaël Llodra were the defending champions, but Llodra decided not to participate.  Gicquel played alongside Nicolas Mahut, but lost in the final to Nikolay Davydenko and Denis Istomin, 4–6, 6–1, [7–10].

Seeds

Draw

Draw

References 
 Main draw

Doubles